Dwight Stone may refer to:

 Dwight Stone (American football) (born 1964), American football wide receiver and kick returner
 Dwight Stone (baseball) (1886–1976), Major League Baseball pitcher

See also
Dwight Stones (born 1953), American television commentator and former high jumper